Jamie Wootton (born 2 October 1994) is an English footballer.

Career
Wootton began his career with Scunthorpe United and made his professional debut on 8 December 2012 in a 2–1 defeat against Bournemouth.

References

External links

1994 births
Living people
Footballers from Rotherham
English footballers
Association football forwards
Scunthorpe United F.C. players
Gainsborough Trinity F.C. players
English Football League players
National League (English football) players